is a subway station in Shinjuku, Tokyo, Japan, operated by the two Tokyo subway operators Tokyo Metropolitan Bureau of Transportation (Toei) and Tokyo Metro.

Lines
Higashi-Shinjuku Station is served by the Toei Oedo Line and the Tokyo Metro Fukutoshin Line. The station is numbered E-02 for the Toei Oedo Line, and F-12 for the Fukutoshin Line.

Station layout
The platforms and tracks are located underground.

Toei platforms
The Toei platform is an island platform serving two tracks located on the third basement ("B3F") level.

Tokyo Metro platforms
The Tokyo Metro station has two island platforms each serving two tracks, with platform 1/2 (southbound) on the fifth basement ("B5F") level and platform 3/4 (northbound) on the sixth basement ("B6F") level. Non-stop trains (Express and Commuter Express) pass stopping (Local) trains  at this station.

History
The station opened on 12 December 2000, with the opening of the Toei Oedo Line. The Tokyo Metro Fukutoshin Line part of the station opened on 14 June 2008.

The two Tokyo Metro island platforms initially used only one track each, with the second tracks for passing non-stop trains hidden behind screens. The Shibuya-bound platform was numbered 1, and the Wakoshi-bound platform was numbered 2. The screens were removed some time in 2015.

Passenger statistics
In fiscal 2011, the Toei station was used by an average of 21,552 passengers daily, and the Tokyo Metro Station was used by 20,188.

Surrounding area

Nissin Foods Tokyo Headquarters
Shinjuku Eastside Square commercial complex (Exit A3), including the headquarters of Citigroup and Square Enix

See also

 List of railway stations in Japan

References

External links

 Toei station information 
 Tokyo Metro station information 

Toei Ōedo Line
Tokyo Metro Fukutoshin Line
Stations of Tokyo Metropolitan Bureau of Transportation
Stations of Tokyo Metro
Railway stations in Tokyo
Railway stations in Japan opened in 2000